John Crabbe may refer to:
 John Crabbe (footballer), English footballer and manager
 John Crabbe (died 1352), Flemish merchant, pirate and soldier
 John C. Crabbe, American neuroscientist and behavior geneticist